Shenandoah Junction is a census-designated place (CDP) in Jefferson County in the U.S. state of West Virginia's Eastern Panhandle. As of the 2010 census, Shenandoah Junction had a population of 703. It is located between Kearneysville and Charles Town off WV 9. Shenandoah Junction is home to Jefferson High School and West Virginia's oldest surviving wood-frame structure, the Peter Burr House, built around 1751. The land where Shenandoah Junction was built was part of the  granted by Lord Fairfax to Lewis Neil. The town was originally called Neil's, but the name was changed to Shenandoah Junction in 1881.

The town owes much of its early growth to the coming of the Baltimore and Ohio Railroad in the 1830s, and the name refers to the junction of the B&O and Norfolk and Western Railway at the center of the community.

Climate
The climate in this area is characterized by hot, humid summers and generally mild to cool winters.  According to the Köppen Climate Classification system, Shenandoah Junction has a humid subtropical climate, abbreviated "Cfa" on climate maps.

References

External links 
Jefferson High School
T.A. Lowery Elementary School

Census-designated places in Jefferson County, West Virginia
Census-designated places in West Virginia
Baltimore and Ohio Railroad